The 2015 Gerry Weber Open was a tennis tournament played on outdoor grass courts. It was the 23rd edition of the event known that year as the Gerry Weber Open and part of the ATP World Tour 500 series of the 2015 ATP World Tour. It took place at the Gerry Weber Stadion in Halle, Germany, between 15 and 21 June 2015.

Points and prize money

Point distribution

Prize money 

*per team

Singles main-draw entrants

Seeds 

 1 Rankings are as of June 8, 2015.

Other entrants 
The following players received wildcards into the singles main draw:
  Dustin Brown
  Jan-Lennard Struff
  Alexander Zverev

The following players received entry from the qualifying draw:
  Ričardas Berankis
  Alejandro Falla
  Lukáš Lacko
  Jarkko Nieminen

Withdrawals 
Before the tournament
  Benjamin Becker →replaced by Borna Ćorić
  Jo-Wilfried Tsonga →replaced by Steve Johnson

Retirements
  Gaël Monfils
  Kei Nishikori

Doubles main-draw entrants

Seeds 

 Rankings are as of June 8, 2015.

Other entrants 
The following pairs received wildcards into the doubles main draw:
  Dustin Brown /  Jan-Lennard Struff
  Alexander Zverev /  Mischa Zverev

The following pair received entry from the qualifying draw:
  Lukáš Rosol /  Sergiy Stakhovsky

Finals

Singles 

  Roger Federer defeated  Andreas Seppi, 7–6(7–1), 6–4

Doubles 

  Raven Klaasen /  Rajeev Ram defeated  Rohan Bopanna /  Florin Mergea, 7–6(7–5), 6–2

External links 
 

 
Halle Open
Gerry Weber Open
Gerry Weber Open